Centeno is a surname. Notable people with the surname include:

Bruno Centeno (born 1988), Argentine footballer
Diego Centeno (1514–1549), Spanish conquistador
Jesus Centeno (born 1983), Venezuelan basketball player
Manuel Centeno (born 1980), former bodyboarding European and world champion
Mário Centeno (born 1966), Portuguese economist, university professor, and politician.
Walter Centeno (born 1974), Costa Rican football midfielder